Presidente João Goulart ("president João Goulart - Brazilian president") is a bairro in the District of Sede in the municipality of Santa Maria, in the Brazilian state of Rio Grande do Sul. It is located in northeast Santa Maria.

Villages 
The bairro contains the following villages: João Goulart, Vila Fredolina, Vila Nova, Vila Operária, Vila Schirmer.

References 

Bairros of Santa Maria, Rio Grande do Sul